Four JG's Orchards & Vineyards is a winery in Colts Neck in Monmouth County, New Jersey. The vineyard was first planted in 1999, and opened to the public in 2004. Four JG's has 40 acres of grapes under cultivation, and produces 2,500 cases of wine per year. The winery is named after the four family members that own it, all of whom have the initials "JG."

Wines
Four JG's produces wine from Cabernet Franc, Cayuga White, Chambourcin, Chardonnay, Vidal blanc, and Vignoles (Ravat 51) grapes. The winery was a participant at the Judgment of Princeton, a wine tasting organized by the American Association of Wine Economists that compared New Jersey wines to premium French vintages. Four JG's is not located in one of New Jersey's three viticultural areas.

Education, licensing, and associations
The winery assisted Monmouth University in creating an on-campus vineyard and winemaking program. Four JG's has a farm winery license from the New Jersey Division of Alcoholic Beverage Control, which allows it to produce up to 50,000 gallons of wine per year, operate up to 15 off-premises sales rooms, and ship up to 12 cases per year to consumers in-state or out-of-state. The winery is a member of the Garden State Wine Growers Association and the Outer Coastal Plain Vineyard Association.

See also
Alcohol laws of New Jersey
American wine
List of wineries, breweries, and distilleries in New Jersey
New Jersey Farm Winery Act
New Jersey Wine Industry Advisory Council
New Jersey wine

References

External links
Garden State Wine Growers Association
Outer Coastal Plain Vineyard Association

Wineries in New Jersey
Tourist attractions in Monmouth County, New Jersey
2004 establishments in New Jersey
Colts Neck Township, New Jersey